Graham John Edwards AM (born 18 July 1946) is an Australian soldier, veterans' advocate and Labor Party member who represented the electorate of Cowan in the Australian House of Representatives from 1998 to 2007.

He was born in Kalgoorlie, Western Australia, and voluntarily joined the Australian Army for service in the Vietnam War in 1968. On 12 May 1970, he was severely injured, losing both legs. After leaving the Army he joined the Department of Defence as an officer with the Vietnam Veterans' Counselling Service. He was elected to the Council of the City of Stirling in 1981.

Edwards was elected to the Western Australian Legislative Council in 1983. He was Parliamentary Secretary to the Cabinet 1987, Minister for Sport and Recreation 1987–89, Minister for Consumer Affairs 1988–93, Minister for Racing and Gaming, Sport and Recreation and Youth 1989–90, Minister for Police and Emergency Services 1990–93, Minister for the Aged 1990–91. Following the defeat of the Labor government of Carmen Lawrence in 1993, he was Leader of the Opposition in the Legislative Council and Shadow Minister for Tourism and Fisheries 1993–94. He retired from the Legislative Council in 1997.

Edwards was first elected to the Australian parliament at the 1998 federal election. He retired from politics at the 2007 federal election.

He competed in the 1993 Hanoi Marathon. At the time, he was 46 years old.  At the time he was Western Australia's Minister for police, emergency services, and sport and recreation. At the 2000 Summer Paralympics, he served as an Athlete Liaison Officer (ALO). In 2000, he was the Chairman of the Australian Paralympic Committee for W.A.

Honours
On 1 January 2001, Edwards was awarded the Australian Sports Medal for "service as vice president of the APF from 1990 to 1993". On 11 June 2012, he was named a Member of the Order of Australia for "service to the Parliaments of Australia and Western Australia, to veterans through advocacy and support roles, and to people with a disability."

Around 2012 he was elected the Western Australian State President of the Returned Servicmens League.

References

1946 births
Living people
People from Kalgoorlie
Australian Labor Party members of the Parliament of Australia
Labor Right politicians
Members of the Australian House of Representatives
Members of the Australian House of Representatives for Cowan
Members of the Western Australian Legislative Council
Australian military personnel of the Vietnam War
Australian amputees
Australian politicians with disabilities
Members of the Order of Australia
Recipients of the Australian Sports Medal
Australian Labor Party members of the Parliament of Western Australia
21st-century Australian politicians
20th-century Australian politicians